Atheist Democracy (Italian: Democrazia Atea, DA) is a political party in Italy. Its ideology includes secularism, atheism, and anticlericalism.

Among the main goals, it campaigns for the abolition of the Lateran Treaty between Italy and the Vatican City.

The party requires all candidates for public office to give proof of debaptism (sbattezzo in Italian). In Italy, many newborn receive baptism; debaptism is a formal procedure to declare oneself no longer part of the Catholic Church.

Widely renowned astrophysicist and scientific communicator Margherita Hack was a member of Atheist Democracy; in 2013 she also ran unsuccessfully for the Italian parliament with the party.

Marco Dimitri also ran for office in 2013 with AD; being Satanist, his move drew some criticism.

In 2018, Atheist Democracy entered the Power to the People! coalition, also inserting the abolition of Lateran Treaty in the shared political program; this affiliation was interrupted in May 2021.

On 1 July 2022, Atheist Democracy, together with far-left parties and organizations (Confederation of the Italian Left, Inventing the Future, The Future City, Italian Communist Party, CARC Party and Italian Marxist-Leninist Party), became part of the "Popular Unity" coordination, with the aim of elaborating and implementing common and shared initiatives and proposals.

Election results

References

External links
 Democrazia Atea

2009 establishments in Italy
Atheism in Italy
Atheist organizations
Socialist parties in Italy
Pacifist parties
Political parties established in 2009